Amt Schlaubetal is an Amt ("collective municipality") in the district of Oder-Spree, in Brandenburg, Germany. Its seat is in Müllrose.

The Amt Schlaubetal consists of the following municipalities:
Grunow-Dammendorf
Mixdorf
Müllrose
Ragow-Merz
Schlaubetal
Siehdichum

Demography

References

Schlaubetal
Oder-Spree